The following are the Pulitzer Prizes for 1942.

Journalism awards

Public Service:
 Los Angeles Times for its successful campaign which resulted in the clarification and confirmation for all American newspapers of the right of free press as guaranteed under the Constitution.
Reporting:
 Stanton Delaplane of the San Francisco Chronicle for his articles on the movement of several California and Oregon counties to secede to form the State of Jefferson, a forty ninth state.
Correspondence:
 Carlos P. Romulo of the  Philippines Herald for his observations and forecasts of Far Eastern developments during a tour of the trouble centers from Hong Kong to Batavia.
Telegraphic Reporting (National):
 Louis Stark of The New York Times for his distinguished reporting of important labor stories during the year.
Telegraphic Reporting (International):
 Laurence Edmund Allen of the Associated Press for his stories of the activities of the British Mediterranean Fleet, written as an accredited correspondent attached to the fleet.
Editorial Writing:
 Geoffrey Parsons of the New York Herald Tribune for his distinguished editorial writing during the year.
Editorial Cartooning:
 Herbert Lawrence Block (Herblock) of the Newspaper Enterprise Association for "British Plane".
Photography:
 Milton Brooks of The Detroit News for his photo entitled, "Ford Strikers Riot".

Letters and Drama Awards

Novel:
 In This Our Life by Ellen Glasgow (Harcourt).
Drama:
 No award given.
History:
 Reveille in Washington, 1860-1865 by Margaret Leech (Harper).
Biography or Autobiography:
Crusader in Crinoline by Forrest Wilson (Lippincott).
Poetry:
 The Dust Which Is God by William Rose Benet (Dodd, Mead).

References

External links
Pulitzer Prizes for 1942

Pulitzer Prizes by year
Pulitzer Prize
Pulitzer Prize